Jennifer F. Biddle is an American ecologist who is a professor of microbial ecology at the University of Delaware.

Early life and education 
Biddle was an undergraduate student at Rutgers University, where she studied biotechnology. She was a doctoral researcher at Pennsylvania State University, where she studied microbial populations in sub-seafloor marine environments with Jean Brenchley.

Research and career 
Biddle joined the Department of Geosciences, then moved to University of North Carolina at Chapel Hill as a postdoctoral researcher in 2007, supported by the NASA postdoctoral program. Biddle is interested in the microbial ecology of subsurface environments. Her early research made use of deep sea drilling to identify organisms in the ocean floor. She used genomic analysis to identify microbes in sediment collected 500 feet below the ocean floor during the International Ocean Discovery Program in 2002.

Biddle also investigated the organisms in deep lakes in the Canadian Rockies. She studied Pavilion Lake through genomic analysis of a series of samples collected at different depths. Working with ExxonMobil, Biddle demonstrated that microbial communities found in deeper seafloor sediments in and around sites of hydrocarbon seepage had considerable available energy and high population turnover rates.

In 2010, Biddle was appointed an assistant professor at the University of Delaware. She was promoted to associate professor in 2017 and full Professor in 2022.

Awards and honors 
 2013 International Ocean Drilling Program Distinguished Lecturer
 2019 American Geophysical Union Fall Meeting Program Representatives
 2021 American Geophysical Union Joanne Simpson Medal

Selected publications

References 

Living people
American ecologists
Rutgers University alumni
Pennsylvania State University alumni
University of Delaware faculty
21st-century American scientists
American women scientists
Year of birth missing (living people)
21st-century American women scientists